|}

This is a list of electoral district results of the 1943 Western Australian election.

Results by Electoral district

Albany

Avon

Beverley 

 Preferences were not distributed.

Boulder

Brown Hill-Ivanhoe

Bunbury

Canning 

 Preferences were not distributed.

Claremont

Collie

East Perth

Forrest

Fremantle

Gascoyne

Geraldton

Greenough

Guildford-Midland 

 Preferences were not distributed.

Hannans

Irwin-Moore 

 Preferences were not distributed.

Kalgoorlie

Kanowna

Katanning

Kimberley

Leederville

Maylands 

 Preferences were not distributed.

Middle Swan

Mount Hawthorn

Mount Magnet

Mount Marshall

Murchison

Murray-Wellington

Nedlands

Nelson

North-East Fremantle

North Perth

Northam

Perth 

 Preferences were not distributed.

Pilbara 

 Preferences were not distributed.

Pingelly

Roebourne

South Fremantle

Subiaco

Sussex

Swan

Toodyay

Victoria Park

Wagin

West Perth

Williams-Narrogin

Yilgarn-Coolgardie

York

See also 

 1943 Western Australian state election
 Members of the Western Australian Legislative Assembly, 1943–1947

References 

Results of Western Australian elections
1943 elections in Australia